Silene sedoides is a species of Silene. It is widely distributed across the Aegean Sea but one of its subspecies is endemic to Greece.

It has hermaphroditic flowers with pink or crimson petals.

References 

sedoides
Flora of Malta